= Eastern Russia =

Eastern Russia may refer to:

- Siberia
- Russian Far East
- North Asia
